The twig snakes (genus Thelotornis), also commonly known as bird snakes or vine snakes,  are a genus of rear-fanged venomous snakes in the family Colubridae. The genus is native to Africa. All species in the genus have a slender and elongated profile, a long tail, a narrow head, and a pointed snout. The eye of all species has a horizontal pupil, shaped like a keyhole, which gives twig snakes binocular vision. Twig snakes are greyish-brown with faint light and dark markings. When threatened, they inflate the throat to display bold black markings between the scales. Twig snakes are deadly: the venom is hemotoxic, affecting the blood clotting mechanism and causing uncontrolled bleeding and internal hemorrhaging. Bites by twig snakes have caused death in humans; famous herpetologist Robert Mertens died after being bitten by his pet savanna vine snake (Thelotornis capensis). However, envenomed bites are extremely rare when not handling the snake, as the fangs can't breach the skin except in a few places like the web between the thumb and fingers.

Species
The genus Thelotornis contains four species which are recognized as being valid.

Nota bene: A binomial authority in parentheses indicates that the species was originally described in a genus other than Thelotornis.

Anatomy and behaviour
Twig snakes are among the few rear-fanged colubrids whose bite is highly venomous and potentially fatal. The venom is hemotoxic, and although its effects are very slow, and bites are rare, no antivenom has been developed and several fatalities (such as Robert Mertens) have occurred. They prey on birds, lizards and frogs, and conceal themselves in trees, though often at a low enough level to be able to also strike at terrestrial prey, which they may swallow upwards after killing.  Their cryptic coloration and apparent ability to freeze or sway gently, as chameleons do, like a twig on a tree (hence the name), makes them hard to spot. Indeed, they may be more abundant in areas than is immediately obvious.

Description
The African twig snakes are distinctive in appearance and unlikely on that continent to be mistaken for any other snake, if indeed the observer notices them. Thelotornis is characterised by a depressed and flat head, keyhole-shaped pupils, and in T. kirtlandii, a projecting canthus rostralis which forms a shallow loreal groove on each side of the head, which allows some binocular vision. In appearance, the head at least is unlikely to be mistaken for any other African snake. Other characteristics include a very long tail and large back fangs. The iris in  T. capensis and T. kirtlandii is yellow, and presumably therefore also in T. usambaricus.

Etymology
The specific name, kirtlandii, is in honor of American naturalist Jared Potter Kirtland.

Gallery

References

Further reading
Boulenger GA (1896). Catalogue of the Snakes in the British Museum (Natural History). Volume III., Containing the Colubridæ (Opisthoglyphæ and Proteroglyphæ) ... London: Trustees of the British Museum (Natural History). (Taylor and Francis, printers). xiv + 727 pp. + Plates I-XXV. (Genus Thelotornis, pp. 184–185).
Branch, Bill (2004). Field Guide to Snakes and other Reptiles of Southern Africa. Sanibel Island, Florida: Ralph Curtis Books. 399 pp. . (Genus Thelotornis, p. 100).
Smith A (1849). Illustrations of the Zoology of South Africa, Reptilia. London: Smith, Elder, and Co. (Thelotornis, new genus).

External links

Colubrids
Venomous snakes